The Bayer designation Sigma Cancri (σ Cnc / σ Cancri) is shared by three star systems, in the constellation Cancer:
 σ1 Cancri, which has the Flamsteed designation 51 Cancri
 σ2 Cancri, which has the Flamsteed designation 59 Cancri
 σ3 Cancri, which has the Flamsteed designation 64 Cancri

The above correspondence between Flamsteed and Bayer designations is the modern one, which is based on the Atlas Coelestis Novus, published by Eduard Heis in 1872. An alternate correspondence sometimes encountered, for instance in the 1835 astronomical catalogue of Thomas Brisbane, is:
 σ1 Cancri = 46 Cancri
 σ2 Cancri = 57 Cancri
 σ3 Cancri = 61 Cancri
Johann Bayer's Uranometria places the sigma between these two groups of stars, making proper association uncertain.

References
 The Bright Star Catalogue, 5th Revised Ed.

Cancri, Sigma
Cancer (constellation)